Island of the Dead may refer to:

 Île des Morts, an island whose name translates as Island of the Dead
 Island of the Dead (1921 film), a German drama film
 Island of the Dead (1955 film), a West German drama film
 Island of the Dead (2000 film), a film directed by Tim Southam and starring Malcolm McDowell and Talisa Soto
 Island of the Dead (Sopor Aeternus and The Ensemble of Shadows album)
 Hart Island (Bronx), site of public cemetery, nicknamed by New York City locals as "The island of the dead"
 Kangaroo Island, known in Australian Aboriginal folklore as Karta, the island of the dead
 Survival of the Dead, a 2009 film directed by George A. Romero, originally titled Island of the Dead

See also 
 Isle of the Dead (disambiguation)